St. Flavian I of Antioch (February 404) was a bishop or Patriarch of Antioch from 381 until his death.

He was born about 320, most probably in Antioch. He inherited great wealth, but resolved to devote his riches and his talents to the service of the church. In association with Diodore, afterwards bishop of Tarsus, he supported the orthodox Faith against the Arian heretic Leontius, who had succeeded Eustathius as Patriarch of Antioch. The two friends assembled their adherents outside the city walls for religious services (according to Theodoret, it was in these meetings that the practice of antiphonal singing was first introduced in the services of the church).

When Meletius was appointed bishop of Antioch in 361 he ordained Flavian to the priesthood, and on the death of Meletius in 381 Flavian was chosen to succeed him. The schism between the two parties was, however, far from being healed. The Bishop of Rome and the Patriarch of Alexandria refused to acknowledge Flavian, and Paulinus, who by the extreme Eustathians had been elected bishop in opposition to Meletius, continued to exercise authority over a portion of the church.

On the death of Paulinus in about 383, Evagrius was chosen as his successor. After the death of Evagrius, (c. 393) Flavian succeeded in preventing the election of a successor, though the Eustathians still continued to hold separate meetings. Through the intervention of John Chrysostom soon after his elevation to the patriarchate of Constantinople in 398, and the influence of the emperor Theodosius I, Flavian was acknowledged in 399 as the sole legitimate bishop of Antioch.

Nevertheless, the Eustathian schism was not finally healed until 415 due to the reconciliation efforts of Alexander (appointed bishop 412), successor to Porphyrios (also spelled Porphyrus). Flavian is posthumously venerated in both the Western and Eastern churches as a Saint.

See also
 Flavian II of Antioch
 Other Flavians and Flaviani

References

320 births
404 deaths
Patriarchs of Antioch
4th-century Byzantine bishops
5th-century Byzantine bishops
4th-century archbishops
5th-century archbishops
5th-century Christian saints